Serial homology is a special type of homology, defined by Owen as "representative or repetitive relation in the segments of the same organism." Ernst Haeckel preferred the term "homotypy" for the same phenomenon.

Classical examples of serial homologies are the development of forelimbs and hind limbs of tetrapods and the iterative structure of the vertebrae.

See also
 Deep homology
 Evolutionary developmental biology

References

Evolutionary biology
Comparative anatomy